Facultad de Medicina is a station on Line D of the Buenos Aires Underground. The station was opened on 23 February 1940 as part of the extension of Line D from Tribunales to Palermo. It owes its name to the UBA Faculty of Medical Sciences, which previously had its seat above the station. The complex above the station is now home to the Faculty of Economic Sciences.

Gallery

References

External links

Buenos Aires Underground stations
Balvanera
1940 establishments in Argentina